Borðoy is an island in the north-east of the Faroe Islands. Its name means 'headland island'. There are eight settlements: Klaksvík (the second largest town in the Faroes), Norðoyri, Ánir, Árnafjørður, Strond, Norðtoftir, Depil and Norðdepil.

History

There are also three abandoned settlements: Skálatoftir, Múli and Fossá, all in the north. Múli was one of the remotest settlements in the Faroes – there was no road link until 1989, before which goods had to be brought in via helicopter or boat. The last people left in 1994.

A Klaksvík museum bought the Fossá area in 1969 with the plan of turning it into a typical Faroese Medieval village, though the plan never came to fruition.

Important Bird Area
The northern and south-eastern headlands of the island have been identified as an Important Bird Area by BirdLife International because of their significance as a breeding site for seabirds, especially European storm petrels (250 pairs) and black guillemots (200 pairs).

Mountains
The island has five mountains: Lokki (755 m), Háfjall (647 m), Borðoyarnes (392 m), Depilsknúkur (680 m), and Hálgafelli (503 m).

References

External links
 
 
 Personal website  with 9 aerial photos of Borðoy

Islands of the Faroe Islands
Important Bird Areas of the Faroe Islands